Mark Stradiotto is a Canadian chemist. He is currently the Arthur B. McDonald Research Chair (CRC Tier-I equivalent) and the Alexander McLeod Professor of Chemistry in the Department of Chemistry at Dalhousie University.

Education and academic career 
Stradiotto received his BSc (Hons.) in applied chemistry (1995) and PhD in organometallic chemistry (1999) from McMaster University, the latter under the supervision of Michael A. Brook and Michael J. McGlinchey. After conducting research as an NSERC Postdoctoral Fellow at the University of California at Berkeley with T. Don Tilley (1999–2001), Stradiotto moved to the Department of Chemistry at Dalhousie University where he now holds the rank of Professor with tenure. In July 2013, Stradiotto was named the Alexander McLeod Professor of Chemistry, and in 2017 he was named a Fellow of the Royal Society of Chemistry (UK). In 2020 he was named an Arthur B. McDonald Research Chair (CRC Tier-I equivalent; 2020–2027). In 2021, Stradiotto was awarded the Canadian Society for Chemistry Rio Tinto Award, for distinguished contributions to the field of inorganic chemistry in Canada.

Research contributions 
Stradiotto’s research is directed toward developing new classes of ancillary ligands/transition metal complexes that exhibit interesting and unusual reactivity patterns, with the goal of incorporating such reactivity into synthetically useful catalytic substrate transformations that can be employed by end-users in both academic and industrial settings. In particular, he is best known for developing the "DalPhos" (DALhousie PHOSphine) ligand family and derived catalyst systems for palladium and nickel cross-couplings that are of relevance to the pharmaceutical industry, many of which have been commercialized. Reported DalPhos ligands and their substrate applications include:

 Ni/CgPhen-DalPhos (tertiary alcohols)
 Ni/PhPAd-DalPhos (sulfonamides, bulky primary alkylamines)
 Ni/Phen-DalPhos (heteroaryl amines, ammonia, indole)
 Ni/PAd2-DalPhos (heteroaryl amines, fluoroalkylamines)
 Ni/NHP-DalPhos (primary alkylamines)
 Ni/CyPAd-DalPhos (primary and secondary aliphatic alcohols, cyclopropylamine and variants)
 Ni/PAd-DalPhos (ammonia and primary alkylamines)
Pd/Mor-DalPhos (ammonia)

Major publications

 "Ligand Design in Metal Chemistry: Reactivity and Catalysis." Edited by Mark Stradiotto and Rylan J. Lundgren Wiley,  2016.  - Review.
"Challenging Nickel-Catalyzed Amine Arylations Enabled by Tailored Ancillary Ligand Design" C. M. Lavoie, P. M. MacQueen, N. L. Rotta-Loria, R. S. Sawatzky, A. Borzenko, A. J. Chisholm, B. K. V. Hargreaves, R. McDonald, M. J. Ferguson and Mark Stradiotto* (Nature Comm. 2016, 7:11073 doi: 10.1038/ncomms11073).
"A P,N-Ligand for Pd-Catalyzed Ammonia Arylation: Coupling of Deactivated Aryl Chlorides, Chemoselective Arylations, and Room Temperature Reactions." R. J. Lundgren, B. D. Peters, P. G. Alsabeh, and Mark Stradiotto* (Angew. Chem. Int. Ed., 2010, 49, 4071-4074).
 "Rhodium- and Iridium-Catalyzed Hydroamination of Alkenes." K. D. Hesp and Mark Stradiotto* (ChemCatChem, 2010, 2, 1192-1207).
 "Addressing Challenges in Palladium-Catalyzed Cross-Coupling Reactions Through Ligand Design." R. J. Lundgren and Mark Stradiotto* (Chem. Eur. J., 2012, 18, 9758-9769).
 "A Highly Versatile Catalyst System for the Cross-Coupling of Aryl Chlorides and Amines." R. J. Lundgren, A. Sappong-Kumankumah, and Mark Stradiotto*. (Chem. Eur. J., 2010, 16, 1983-1991).
 "Stereo- and Regioselective Gold-Catalyzed Hydroamination of Internal Alkynes with Dialkylamines." K. D. Hesp and Mark Stradiotto* (J. Am. Chem. Soc., 2010, 132, 18026-18029).

References

External links 
Stradiotto group website

21st-century Canadian chemists
Fellows of the Royal Society of Chemistry
Year of birth missing (living people)
Living people
Canada Research Chairs
Academic staff of the Dalhousie University
McMaster University alumni